Greshnevo is a village in Nekrasovsky District of Yaroslavl Oblast, Russia.  Population: 588.

The great Russian poet Nikolay Nekrasov lived here during his childhood.  Presently, the village is home to a Nekrasov museum.  The village was renamed Nekrasovo in the past, but the original name Greshnevo has been restored since then.

References

Rural localities in Yaroslavl Oblast